Karl Westa (April 8, 1875 – March 3, 1949) was a United States Navy sailor and a recipient of the United States military's highest decoration, the Medal of Honor.

Biography
Karl Westa was born in Norway and immigrated to the United States. He departed on board the Danish vessel  from the port of Kristiansand and arrived in New York City on  September 5, 1905.

On that day, while the North Dakota was conducting tests using oil as fuel, an explosion occurred, killing three sailors and endangering the ship. In the engine room, pieces of hot coal and coke floated in waist-high hot water, oil was aflame above one of the boilers, and the entire room was filled with smoke, steam, and fumes. Despite these dangers, Westa and five other men of the ship's engineering department entered the engine room to haul the boiler fires and perform other tasks necessary to prevent a boiler explosion. After ensuring the safety of the ship, they then searched for and removed the bodies of the three sailors killed in the initial explosion.

For these actions, Westa and the five other men were awarded the Medal of Honor a month later, on October 4. The others were Chief Machinist's Mate Thomas Stanton, Chief Watertender August Holtz, Chief Watertender Patrick Reid, Machinist's Mate First Class Charles C. Roberts, and Watertender Harry Lipscomb.

Westa left the Navy while still a chief machinist's mate. He died at age 73 and was buried at Arlington National Cemetery, Arlington County, Virginia.

Medal of Honor citation
Westa's official Medal of Honor citation reads:
On board the U.S.S. North Dakota, for extraordinary heroism in the line of his profession during the fire on board that vessel, 8 September 1910.

See also

List of Medal of Honor recipients
List of Medal of Honor recipients in non-combat incidents

References

External links
 

1875 births
1949 deaths
Norwegian emigrants to the United States
United States Navy sailors
United States Navy Medal of Honor recipients
Norwegian-born Medal of Honor recipients
Burials at Arlington National Cemetery
Non-combat recipients of the Medal of Honor